Hyposmocoma scandens is a species of moth of the family Cosmopterigidae. It was first described by Lord Walsingham in 1907. It is endemic to the island of Hawaii.

External links

scandens
Endemic moths of Hawaii